Spiniphallellus stonisi is a moth of the family Gelechiidae. It was described by Oleksiy V. Bidzilya and Ole Karsholt in 2008. It is found in south-eastern Kazakhstan.

The wingspan is about 17 mm. Adults are on wing in early August.

Etymology
The species is named for Professor Jonas Rimantas Stonis.

References

Moths described in 2008
Anomologini